Matthew "Mattie" McDonagh (1936 – 11 April 2005) was an Irish Gaelic footballer who played for his local club Ballygar and at senior level for the Galway county team from 1956 until 1968. McDonagh later served as manager of the Galway team. He is the only man from Connacht with four All-Ireland Senior Football Championship winner's medals.

Biography
He sprung to sporting prominence as a teenager when he starred with Summerhill College, Sligo, where his colleagues remembered him from his striking stature as a youngster. Before he was 18 he had won the Connacht Colleges title and also won a Roscommon minor hurling medal with Ballygar.

Big Mattie burst on to the national scene in 1956 when forming the midfield partnership with Frank Evers which provided the possession lifeline for the side which powered their way to a 2–13 to 3–7 All-Ireland final victory over Cork on the day that Seán Purcell and Frank Stockwell ran riot, Stockwell setting a scoring record of 2–05 from play.

After the initial flush of success some lean years followed and Mattie had to bear the disappointment of two county final defeats with Ballygar at the hands of Tuam Stars and Dunmore McHales, the later by the narrowest of margins but the best was yet to come.

McDonagh was one of the most influential players in the Galway teams of the 1960s. After Galway had been beaten by Dublin in the 1963 All-Ireland Senior Football Championship Final, when Gerry Davey scored the controversial winning goal, the county under the stewardship of John Dunne, was to embark on their greatest ever run of success, winning three All-Ireland titles, beating Kerry in the first two and Meath in 1966 to complete the three-in-a-row, where Mattie McDonagh will be forever remembered in firing home ’left footed’ the only goal of the match in a 1–10 to 0–7 victory.

McDonagh is the only Connacht player to have won four senior All-Ireland medals.

He never shirked a challenge and took on the task of managing the Galway senior team in 1980 after a turbulent period when player power made the headlines in the county and a cool and respected head was needed to settle the ship.

McDonagh, although fiercely competitive in every sport, was blessed with an easy temperament which helped him to assuage fears and tensions. One year later he led Galway to what turned out to be their last National League success when routing Roscommon in the Croke Park final although their semi-final victory over Kerry in Ennis was the real highlight of that series.

The same year he and his charges had to endure the shock of a Connacht championship defeat when Willie Nally and Willie Joe Padden of Mayo "caught all around them" but the following year Galway were desperately disappointed to lose out to Offaly in the 1982 semi-final before going all the way to the final in the infamous decider of 1983 when Dublin edged Galway out.

In the years after he was always willing to help out with under-age teams and threw in his lot with John Tobin's minor winning team of 1986 where his experience and cool ahead proved to be an invaluable asset to the management team.

Mattie McDonagh died at the age of 68 on 10 April 2005. Tributes poured in from GAA colleagues and officials including GAA president Seán Kelly, who said that the Association was greatly saddened by his loss. He was buried in his native Ballygar soil.

Honours

Ballygar
Galway Senior Football Championship:
Winner (0):
Runner-up (2): 1957, 1958, 1961

Galway
All-Ireland Senior Football Championship:
Winner (4): 1956, 1964, 1965, 1966
Runner-up (2): 1959, 1963
Connacht Senior Football Championship:
Winner (10): 1956, 1957, 1958, 1959, 1960, 1963, 1964, 1965, 1966, 1968
Runner-up (2): 1961, 1962
National Football League:
Winner (2): 1956–57, 1964–65
Runner-up (1): 1966-67

Connacht
Railway Cup:
Winner (1): 1958

References

 

1936 births
2005 deaths
Alumni of St Patrick's College, Dublin
Ballygar Gaelic footballers
Ballygar hurlers
Connacht inter-provincial Gaelic footballers
Dual players
Gaelic football forwards
Galway inter-county Gaelic footballers
Irish schoolteachers
Texaco Footballers of the Year
Winners of four All-Ireland medals (Gaelic football)